Welcome Zindagi (Marathi: वेलकम जिंदगी) is a Marathi language film. The film is a dark comedy about a girl who wants to end it all, and a boy who will change her perception of life. The movie is a dark comedy about life and death. The film is a remake of successful Bengali language film, Hemlock Society, which starred Koel Mallick and Parambrata Chatterjee in lead roles.

Plot
Meera, a young media professional, finds herself cornered every step of the way, as she tries to live a normal life. She feels ignored by her father, betrayed by her fiancé, faces trouble at work. The only escape route she can think of, is taking her own life with a massive dose of sleeping pills.

Enters Anand Prabhu, who stops her at a crucial moment, although he has no plans of making her change her mind. His advice instead, is to go about it systematically. Anand is the founder of ‘Happy Ending Society’, an organization that believes that every person has a right to decide his, or her own fate. Anand gladly offers to make Meera an expert in various ways of ending her life by enrolling her in a 3-day suicide camp, organized by Happy Ending.

While Meera is busy making a choice between life and death surrounded by the like-minded students and over enthusiastic staff, Meera’s father Dr Rajwade leaves no stone unturned to find his estranged daughter.

What happens next? Will Meera finally succeed in carrying out her wish? Does Anand have an ulterior motive in keeping Meera at the Suicide camp? Will Meera reunite with her father? And what is the truth behind ‘Happy Ending Society’?

Walking a thin line between comedy and drama, Welcome Zindagi delivers a poignant message in the garb of entertainment.

Cast
 Swapnil Joshi
 Amruta Khanvilkar
 Ashmita 
 Mohan Agashe
 Satish Alekar
 Prashant Damle
 Bharti Achrekar
 Rajeshwari Sachdev
 Vivek Lagoo
 Pushkar Shrotri
 Murli Sharma
 Urmila Kanitkar-Kothare
 Jayant Wadkar
 Mahesh Manjrekar (special appearance)

Soundtrack

References

External links

 
 

2015 films
Marathi remakes of Bengali films
2010s Marathi-language films